Sir Harold George Parlett  (1869 – 1945) was a British consular diplomat and writer on Japanese Buddhism.

Biography
Parlett was born in 1869 in England. In 1890, Parlett travelled to Japan to work as a student interpreter, later becoming the acting registrar at the British Court in Japan. A contemporary of Ernest Satow, Parlett contributed to Satow's An English-Japanese dictionary of the spoken language. In the early 1890s he assisted the collector Arthur Morrison assemble his collection of Japanese paintings, subsequently acquired by the British Museum. When in 1900 the legation was upgraded to an Embassy, he became the Japanese British Counsellor. In 1901, he published a translated edition of Sumiyoshi Monogatari.In 1919 Parlett was promoted to assistant Japanese Secretary. In 1924 he translated a series of works by Dante into Japanese for Satow and was knighted in the same year. In 1927 he retired from diplomacy and began writing works specialising on Eastern affairs and Buddhism, writing a short memoir of Charles Eliot in 1935 and articles in the Blackwood Edinburgh Magazine. He was coaxed out of retirement during the years 1942–1945 to work in the British Foreign Office due to his knowledge of Japanese.

Works
A brief account of diplomatic events in Manchuria, 1929

References

1869 births
1945 deaths
British diplomats
Knights Bachelor
Companions of the Order of St Michael and St George